A list of films produced by the Marathi language film industry based in Maharashtra in the year 1968.

1968 releases
A list of Marathi films released in 1968.

References

Lists of 1968 films by country or language
1968
1968 in Indian cinema